Belkis Leal (born 21 May 1940) is a Venezuelan fencer. She competed in the women's individual and team foil events at the 1960 Summer Olympics.

References

External links
 

1940 births
Living people
Venezuelan female foil fencers
Olympic fencers of Venezuela
Fencers at the 1960 Summer Olympics
Sportspeople from Caracas
Pan American Games medalists in fencing
Pan American Games silver medalists for Venezuela
Pan American Games bronze medalists for Venezuela
Fencers at the 1959 Pan American Games
Fencers at the 1963 Pan American Games
20th-century Venezuelan women